Christine Leo Roussel (born January 20, 1939) is an American author, art historian, curator, photographer, and consultant. She worked under Thomas Hoving at the Metropolitan Museum of Art and then created her own studio, Roussel Art Conservation. She is known for her knowledge of the art work in her native New York City, specializing in sculpture conservation. She was an assistant to Nelson Rockefeller, and is the author of The Art of Rockefeller Center which provides a detailed history of all the works located within Rockefeller Center. Her niece is Academy Award-winning actress Melissa Leo.

Personal life
She was born in New York City, the daughter of Elinore (née Wellington; 1914–2008) and Arnold Leo II. She has two brothers, Roger Leo (1947–2011), a journalist, and Arnold Leo III. Arnold's daughter is Melissa Leo, an actress. Christine's son is Marc Roussel, who is also involved in the art industry.

She graduated from The High School of Music & Art in New York City. She then traveled to Europe, living in Greece and France. While living in France she was an apprentice under Ossip Zadkine and studied at the Académie de la Grande Chaumière. She hold two master's degrees, in Art and Education from Goddard College in Vermont. She completed her undergraduate work at Wilson College.

Career
During her tenure at the Metropolitan Museum of Art working under Thomas Hoving, Roussel worked on the exhibits of King Tutankhamun, traveling to Egypt on several occasions.

She is often called upon to discuss various art works, and has been a guest-lecturer at many universities, and appeared in many television programs and magazines as a guest. She received a special award from the National Association of Professional Women for her art conservation work in New York City. Roussel is also a photographer, and her prints have appeared in various books and art exhibits. She is a former board member at the Benaki Museum in Athens, Greece and has served on numerous other boards at museums around the world. Her conservation work includes restoring the Statue of Liberty and the Reclining Figure, located outside of Lincoln Center. She is also a member of the National Arts Club.

References

1945 births
Living people
American curators
American women curators
American women artists
American women historians
Women art historians
American art historians
The High School of Music & Art alumni
Historians from New York (state)
21st-century American women